A. Konduru mandal is one of the 20 mandals in the NTR district of the Indian state of Andhra Pradesh.

Administration 

A. Konduru mandal is one of the 4 mandals under Tiruvuru (SC) (Assembly constituency), which in turn represents Vijayawada (Lok Sabha constituency) of Andhra Pradesh.

Towns and villages 

 census, the mandal has 13 villages. The settlements in the mandal are listed below:

References 

Mandals in NTR district